Candace Elizabeth Smith (born February 1, 1977) is an American lawyer, actress, television personality, life coach, and author from Dayton, Ohio.

Early life and education
Candace was born in Dayton, Ohio and is a graduate of Chaminade Julienne High School. She earned a Bachelor of Arts degree in psychology from University of Dayton and a Juris Doctor from Northwestern University in Chicago, Illinois. Her father was Ohio State Representative C. J. McLin  He passed from prostate cancer when Candace was only eleven years old. She was raised by a single mother.  Her grandfather was civic leader Mac McLin and her half-sister is politician Rhine McLin.

Career 
Candace attended the University of Dayton on the prestigious W.S. McIntosh full academic scholarship and graduated with a Bachelor of Arts in Psychology and a minor in Communications. During this time, she completed a Communications and Marketing program at the University of London. Candace began life coaching while attending law school at Northwestern University School of Law in Chicago. After passing the Ohio Bar exam in 2002, she began practicing commercial real estate law at the largest law firm in Ohio. During this time, she won the title of Miss Ohio USA.  After her reign, she relocated to Los Angeles to pursue entertainment and begin writing a book.

Entertainment career 
Upon arriving in Los Angeles, Candace began modeling in national commercial and print campaigns. After a brief stint on The Price Is Right as a Barker's Beauty, Candace refocused on her acting career.  In television, she landed roles on Fox's Method & Red, HBO's Entourage, NBC's Joey and Heroes. Candace made her film debut in the Warner Bros. comedy Beerfest.  She worked with Broken Lizard again in The Babymakers and The Slammin' Salmon, as the sister to Michael Clarke Duncan.  In David Ayer's End of Watch, Candace plays a distressed mother opposite Jake Gyllenhaal and Michael Peña.  In the action film "My Father, Die", produced by Pierce Brosnan, Candace performs her on stunts as the lead.  Starring opposite Rosario Dawson and Vanessa Hudgens in the film Gimme Shelter, she appears as Marie Abeanni, an African social worker.

Candace appears in ABC's holiday film "Same Time, Next Christmas" starring Lea Michele, as the sister to Charles Michael Davis. In the Netflix comedy The Wrong Missy, Candace plays opposite David Spade as the wife to Roman Reigns.  Most recently, she guest starred on Trutv's Tacoma FD.  

As a life coach and love expert, Candace has appeared on several networks including Bravo, E!, WE tv and the USA network. As a producer, Candace has experience on the VH1 documentary "Finding the Funk" and on several reality shows.

Trained in improv at Upright Citizen's Brigade, Candace performed her first stand-up comedy show at The Comedy Store on Sunset Blvd.

Filmography

Film

Television

References

External links
 Official website

 Candace Smith biography for Survivor: Tocantins at CBS.com

1977 births
African-American actresses
Living people
Ohio lawyers
Miss USA 2003 delegates
University of Dayton alumni
Northwestern University Pritzker School of Law alumni
Actresses from Dayton, Ohio
Survivor (American TV series) contestants
African-American lawyers
American women lawyers
Female models from Ohio
21st-century African-American women
21st-century African-American people
20th-century African-American people
20th-century African-American women